Samira Ibrahim Islam is a Saudi Arabian pharmacologist and scholar. She heads King Fahd Medical Research Center's Drug Monitoring Unit at King Abdulaziz University. She was instrumental in securing formal university education for women in Saudi Arabia.

Early life and education
Islam was born in al-Hafuf, al-Ahsaa, Saudi Arabia. Following her secondary education, Islam was sent to Egypt to finish her schooling. She initially enrolled at the Medical School of the University of Alexandria but transferred to the School of Pharmacy after a year. Here she obtained a BSc in Pharmacy and Pharmaceutical Sciences in 1964, followed by a Masters in 1966. Islam continued to study pharmacology, becoming the first Saudi woman to earn a PhD in 1970.

Career 
In 1971, Islam began to lecture at King Abdulaziz University. She was appointed Academic Advisor for the girl's section of the Makkah and Jeddah branches of the university in 1973. She worked to establish formal university education for Saudi women. She became Vice Dean of the Faculty of Medicine in 1974. In 1983, she was appointed as Professor of Pharmacology, becoming the first person from Saudi Arabia to achieve this.

Islam has been recognized as an advocate of the nursing profession and founded the first faculty of nursing in Saudi Arabia in 1976.

Research 
Islam has investigated drug metabolism as it pertains to the Saudi population. She founded and heads the Drug Monitoring Unit of King Fahd Medical Research Center at King Abdulaziz University.  Islam is on the board of the Arab Science and Technology Foundation.

Islam received a Makkah Award of Excellence for her research on the effects and impact of medication on Saudis.

See also
 Timeline of women in science

References

Living people
Academic staff of King Abdulaziz University
Saudi Arabian pharmacologists
Women pharmacologists
21st-century women scientists
Saudi Arabian women scientists
Year of birth missing (living people)